Mortal Kombat Legends: Battle of the Realms is a 2021 American direct-to-video adult animated martial arts film, directed by Ethan Spaulding from a screenplay by Jeremy Adams, based on the Mortal Kombat franchise created by Ed Boon and John Tobias, it is the second installment in the Legends series and a direct sequel to Mortal Kombat Legends: Scorpion's Revenge (2020). Produced by Warner Bros. Animation and animated by Studio Mir, Boon returned from the predecessor as creative consultant.

It borrows source materials from  Mortal Kombat II, Mortal Kombat 3, Mortal Kombat: Deception and Mortal Kombat X, the movie revolves around the otherworldly Mortal Kombat tournament set in Outworld. Liu Kang is chosen to fulfill his destiny as a tournament champion while Scorpion sets out to prevent the Kamidogu artifact from falling into the hands of Shinnok as he comes into conflict with the younger Sub-Zero.

The movie was released on August 31, 2021 on Blu-ray and Ultra HD Blu-ray as well as digitally. A sequel, Mortal Kombat Legends: Snow Blind, was released on October 11, 2022 on Blu-ray, 4K Ultra HD, and Digital.

Plot
Following the events of the previous Mortal Kombat tournament, Shao Kahn declares war on Earthrealm in retaliation for Shang Tsung 's defeat through a new Mortal Kombat tournament set in Outworld. Princess Kitana, Kintaro, General Reiko, and Jade lead the Emperor's first wave invasion force of Outworld warriors and Netherrealm demons, laying siege against the Wu Shi monastery, but are repelled by Kung Lao and Special Forces cybernetically enhanced Jackson Briggs and NYPD officer Kurtis Stryker. At the onset of their assault, the Outworld commanders are confronted by movie star Johnny Cage and Jax's partner Sonya Blade.

When Johnny and Sonya are soon joined by Liu Kang and Raiden as negotiations fail, Shao Kahn appears himself, petitioning Raiden to participate in a final Mortal Kombat tournament to permanently decide Earthrealm's fate. The thunder god agrees, and he and Shao Kahn venture to the realm of the Elder Gods to propose this ultimate contest.

Meanwhile, Scorpion reawakens back in the Netherrealm. He is confronted by the enraged Elder God Shinnok over the death of his favored servant Quan Chi. Shinnok engineers Scorpion's entrance into Earthrealm in hopes of utilizing the key embedded in his body by hiring the Lin Kuei clan. Back in Earthrealm, Lin Kuei members Kuai Liang and Smoke are summoned by the grandmaster to hunt down Scorpion. They are horrified to witness their missing peers having undergone cybernetic biomodifications as a means to strengthen the clan, with the juniors expected to do the same. Liang and Smoke rebel, with Liang being the only one to flee successfully. Liang then adopts his deceased brother's codename, Sub-Zero.

Back at the Wu Shi Temple, Raiden returns to his troops after arranging to hold and participate in the tournament while relinquishing his immortality. Once the Earthrealm warriors head for Outworld, Scorpion makes his presence known to Raiden. He mentions the key to Shinnok's prison has bonded to his soul and came to Raiden for advice about its purpose. Raiden informs him that it is a key to untold power known as the Kamidogu, a supreme magical relic from a bygone era that could doom all the realms.

At the start of the tournament, Cage is defeated by Kytinn warrior D'Vorah; Sonya defeats D'Vorah and Li Mei; Kang defeats Jade; Stryker defeats Baraka; Jax defeats Kintaro by ripping his arms out of their sockets.

Back on Earth, Scorpion is being pursued by Cyrax and Sektor in a dockside shipping yard. The trio are soon interrupted by Sub-Zero, but even he is outmatched by their superior enhancements and the arrival of the cybernetic Smoke. With their enemies overwhelmed, the three cyber Lin Kuei apprehend their Hellspawn prey and make off to the Temple of Elements. At their destination, they force Hanzo to open their designated portal. As they prepare to eliminate him upon accessing its gateway, they are interrupted again by a vengeful Sub-Zero. Scorpion fails to console Kuai Liang over mistakenly murdering his brother but agrees to a temporary alliance against Sub-Zero's clan. Despite their efforts, the Lin Kuei retrieve the Kamidogu, leaving the pair for dead when the mountain crumbles on top of them.

As the second half of the final tournament is underway, Lao and Stryker are killed by Shao Kahn and Shang Tsung, respectively. Kitana rebels against her stepfather instead of fighting against Raiden, only to be beaten into submission. Kang defeats Shang Tsung regardless of a setback and spares him.

In the Netherrealm, the Lin Kuei realize too late that their employer was Shinnok and learn of his plan to revive the One Being and bring an end to all of creation. Subsequently, they are betrayed and killed for their services.

During the tournament's final stage, Raiden dies while losing his battle against Shao Kahn, enraging Kang to defeat the emperor and win the tournament. However, celebrations are cut short as Shinnok finally succeeds in resurrecting the One Being and fusing himself. With the aid of the Elder Gods, Sub-Zero, and Scorpion, Liu Kang engages fights and kills Shinnok while Johnny, Jax, Kitana, and Sonya protect civilians from Kahn's remaining army.

In the aftermath, Kang absorbs the One Being's power and reverts the realms into their original state, including Edenia. Sonya and Johnny share a kiss while Liu and Kitana hold hands in hard-earned peace, unaware that Raiden is revived with his immortality.

Voice cast

 Jordan Rodrigues as Liu Kang
 Dave B. Mitchell as Raiden, Sektor, Kintaro
 Joel McHale as Johnny Cage
 Jennifer Carpenter as Sonya Blade
 Ike Amadi as Jax Briggs, One Being
 Artt Butler as Shang Tsung, Shao Kahn Soldier, Cyrax
 Robin Atkin Downes as Shinnok, Reiko
 Grey Griffin as Kitana, Satoshi Hasashi, Li Mei
 Matthew Yang King as Kung Lao
 Bayardo De Murguia as Kuai Liang / Sub-Zero
 Matthew Mercer as Kurtis Stryker, Demon One, Smoke
 Paul Nakauchi as the Lin Kuei Grandmaster
 Emily O'Brien as Jade, Liu Lin
 Patrick Seitz as Hanzo Hasashi / Scorpion
 Fred Tatasciore as Shao Kahn 
 Debra Wilson as D'Vorah
 Matthew Lillard as Shaggy Rogers (cameo)

Production

Development
Following the release of Scorpion's Revenge in April 2020, screenwriter Jeremy Adams expressed interest in doing a sequel. In June 2021, a sequel was announced, with most of the cast and crew from the previous film now set to return. On the day before the film's release, a Warner Bros. Animation logo variant featuring Shaggy Rogers from Scooby-Doo strangling Scorpion was uploaded onto the internet, inspired by the "Ultra Instinct Shaggy" internet meme, as a follow up to the previous film's logo variant featuring Scorpion strangling Daffy Duck in place of Porky Pig.

Casting
Matthew Mercer reprises his role as Kurtis Stryker from the 2011 video game. Dave B. Mitchell reprises his role as Sektor from Mortal Kombat 11, and Matthew Yang King, who voiced both Liu Kang and Fujin in Mortal Kombat 11, now voices Kung Lao.

Release

Home media
The film earned $1,652,738 from domestic Blu-ray sales.

Reception
Battle of the Realms holds a 50% rating with six reviews on Rotten Tomatoes, and has received mixed to negative critical reception. Mitchell Saltzman of IGN rated the film a five out of ten, calling it "a swing and a whiff" in that it "feels all over the place, attempting to tell too many stories at once and not doing any of them justice." Luke Y. Thompson of SuperHeroHype called the plot "wildly inconsistent" and that it "mostly serves as the thinnest of devices to get to the next fight." Den of Geek called the film "a narrative mess ... an incredibly busy movie that has too much going on to the point that there are two completely separate storylines happening at the same time that only briefly connect but ultimately converge in a bonkers and completely tacked on finale." However, Tanner Dedmon of ComicBook.com wrote that the film "wastes no time getting to the action" and "doubles down on things like x-rayed blows and key catchphrases that honor the source material and give characters their big moments without being too distracting."

References

External links
 

2020s American animated films
2021 animated films
2021 films
2021 direct-to-video films
2021 fantasy films
2021 martial arts films
American adult animated films
American action films
American sequel films
American splatter films
Animated films about revenge
2020s English-language films
Films produced by Sam Register
Films about parallel universes
Martial arts fantasy films
Martial arts tournament films
Mortal Kombat films
Ninja films
Resurrection in film
Warner Bros. Animation animated films
Warner Bros. direct-to-video animated films
Warner Bros. direct-to-video films
Films directed by Ethan Spaulding
Anime-influenced Western animation
Studio Mir films